J. B. Larue was a California businessman and politician who founded the village of San Antonio in what is now Oakland, California.

Life and work
Larue was born James Buskirk Larue in Franklin, New Jersey on February 6, 1800. 

In 1835, Larue migrated from New Jersey to Pipestone Township, Michigan, where he purchased land and built a sawmill. From 1840 to 1841, Larue served as a representative in the Michigan legislature. In 1850 he left Michigan for the California gold rush. 

Once in California, Larue purchased part of the  Rancho San Antonio lands from Luis Maria Peralta in 1851, building a wharf and store at the same location.

In 1857, Larue was elected to the California State Senate representing the county of Alameda.

In 1858, Larue began the Oakland and San Antonio Steam Navigation Company, operating a cut-rate passenger ferry  between Oakland and San Francisco. Larue was sued by his competitor Minturn, who claimed an exclusive contract with the city of Oakland to operate the Oakland-San Francisco ferry route. The case was appealed to the U.S. Supreme court, with Minturn's exclusivity claims being rejected.

Larue died January 7, 1872 in Alameda County.

References 

California state senators
1800 births
1872 deaths
History of Oakland, California
People from Oakland, California
19th-century American politicians
People of the California Gold Rush